Onakoya is a Yoruba surname. Notable people with the surname include:

 Abiola Onakoya, Nigerian athlete
 Tunde Onakoya, Nigerian chess coach

Yoruba-language surnames